Lorena Salvatini Spoladore (born 19 December 1995) is a Brazilian Paralympic athlete who competes in sprinting and long jump events at international elite events. She has won two medals at the 2016 Summer Paralympics, a World champion in long jump and has won four bronze medals in sprinting.

References

1995 births
Living people
People from Maringá
Paralympic athletes of Brazil
Brazilian female sprinters
Brazilian female long jumpers
Athletes (track and field) at the 2016 Summer Paralympics
Medalists at the 2016 Summer Paralympics
Medalists at the World Para Athletics Championships
Medalists at the 2015 Parapan American Games
Medalists at the 2019 Parapan American Games
Athletes (track and field) at the 2020 Summer Paralympics
Sportspeople from Paraná (state)
21st-century Brazilian women